The Ferndene State Reserve is a protected area in the Dial Range of northwest Tasmania, Australia. It comprises  and is managed by the Tasmania Parks and Wildlife Service. It was established on 2 August 1939 and is described by the Parks and Wildlife Service as a "scenic fern glade".

References

Parks and Wildlife Service; Reserves under the Nature Conservation Act 2002; web publication; retrieved 8 April 2007.
Dial Range Recreation Management Plan ; June 2000; Inspiring Place Consultants and Office of Sport and Recreation Tasmania.

State reserves of Tasmania